Dariusz Antoni Kłeczek (born 20 June 1957 in Jedlnia Letnisko) is a Polish politician. He was elected to the Sejm on 25 September 2005, getting 16,698 votes in 23 Rzeszów district as a candidate from the Law and Justice list.

He was also a member of Senate 1997-2001.

See also
Members of Polish Sejm 2005-2007

External links
Dariusz Antoni Kłeczek - parliamentary page - includes declarations of interest, voting record, and transcripts of speeches.

1957 births
Living people
People from Radom County
Members of the Polish Sejm 2005–2007
Law and Justice politicians
Polish Roman Catholics